Systelloderes is a genus of gnat bugs in the family Enicocephalidae. There are about 12 described species in Systelloderes.

Species
These 12 species belong to the genus Systelloderes:

 Systelloderes biceps (Say, 1832)
 Systelloderes crassatus Usinger, 1932
 Systelloderes dorsalis Kritsky
 Systelloderes grandis Kritsky, 1978
 Systelloderes inusitatus Drake & Harris, 1927
 Systelloderes iowensis Drake & Harris, 1927
 Systelloderes lateralis Kritsky, 1978
 Systelloderes lateralus Kritsky
 Systelloderes moschatus Blanchard, 1852
 Systelloderes notialis Woodward, 1956
 Systelloderes terrenus Drake & Harris
 Systelloderes utukhengal Stys

References

Further reading

 

Enicocephalomorpha
Heteroptera genera
Articles created by Qbugbot